B17 or B-17 may refer to:

Aviation 

 Boeing B-17 Flying Fortress, an American World War II heavy bomber
 Saab B 17, series of Swedish dive bomber/reconnaissance aircraft

B-17 Flying Fortress related
B-17, Queen of the Skies, a solitaire board war-game
B-17 Bomber (game), a 1982 Mattel game made for the Intellivision console
B-17 Flying Fortress (computer game), a flight simulator
"B-17", a segment from Heavy Metal

Transportation and vehicles
B17 (New York City bus), a bus line serving Brooklyn
LNER Class B17, a British 4-6-0 steam locomotive class 
B17, a bicycle saddle line by Brooks England
 A generation of Nissan Sentra built since 2013

Other uses
Amygdalin, sometimes incorrectly referred to as vitamin B17
 Boron-17 (B-17 or 17B), an isotope of boron
HLA-B17, an HLA - B serotype gene
B17, the Steinitz variation of the Caro-Kann Defence's code from the Encyclopaedia of Chess Openings
"Please Mr. Please", song about a song in slot B-17 of a jukebox
Sector B17, a housing scheme project in Islamabad, Pakistan

See also

 B117 (disambiguation)
 17 (disambiguation)

no:B-17